Mariana Frenk-Westheim (June 4, 1898 – June 24, 2004) was a writer of Spanish-Mexican prose, hispanist, lecturer of literature, museum expert and a Mexican translator.

Mariana Frenk-Westheim, a daughter of Jewish parents, was born in Hamburg and left Germany in 1930 together with her husband, physician Ernst Frenk, and two children, and moved overseas to Mexico. After her husband's death she married Paul Westheim, an art historian. 
 
Her most renowned translations are those of the books by Mexican author, Juan Rulfo. In 2002 she published her poems in a volume, "Tausend Reime für Große und Kleime. Die Tier- und Dingwelt alphabetisch vorgestellt". She died in Mexico City, 106 years of age.

In 2013, Frenk-Westheim's daughter Margit Frenk sued for the return of paintings from Westheim's art collection, alleging that Charlotte Weidler, to whom they had been entrusted in Nazi Germany, sold them illegally after telling Westheim that they had been destroyed.

References

1898 births
2004 deaths
Mexican women writers
German emigrants to Mexico
Mexican Jews
Mexican centenarians
Mexican translators
Spanish–German translators
Mexican people of German-Jewish descent
Women centenarians
20th-century translators